The Conservative Party of Kenya is a political party in the Republic of Kenya. It did not have much history of electoral success, or even activity, until it was reported that members of the Jubilee coalition of parties intended to convert it into a single party to contest the 2017 General election, within which Uhuru Kenyatta and William Ruto intend to gain re-election as President and Deputy President respectively.

References

Conservative parties in Africa
Political parties in Kenya
Political parties with year of establishment missing